Albert Maurel Uttley (14 August, 1906, London - 13 September, 1985 Bexhill) was an English scientist involved in computing, cybernetics, neurophysiology and psychology. He was a member of the Ratio Club and was the person who suggested its name.

Albert was the son of George and Ethel Uttley. He married Gwendoline Lucy Richens.

Publications
 "Information, machines, and brains", Trans. of the IRE Professional Group on Information Theory (TIT) 1: 143-149 (1953)
 "A theory on the mechanism of learning based on the computation of conditional probabilities", Proceedings of the First International Congress on Cybernetics, Naumur 1956 pp.830-856
 "The Design of Conditional Probability Computers", Information and Control 2(1): 1-24 (1959)

References

1906 births
1985 deaths
English scientists
Scientists from London